Mark Makama Tanko (born 1 May 1996) is a Nigerian professional footballer who plays as a midfielder for National Independent Soccer Association side Los Angeles Force.

Career
Born in Abuja in Nigeria, Tanko began his playing career in Mexico as part of the youth squad for Club Tijuana. In 2016, Tanko was loaned to Dorados de Sinaloa of Ascenso MX and he made his professional debut in a Copa MX match against Querétaro on 27 July.

In 2019, Tanko left Tijuana and signed with Serie A de México side Pioneros de Cancún. He played 9 matches for the club before moving to the United States.

During the summer of 2019, Tanko moved to USL League Two club Ventura County Fusion where he played 11 matches during the season. After playing with the Fusion, Tanko signed with the Los Angeles Force of the National Independent Soccer Association. He played in the Force's West Coast Championship match against California United Strikers FC, in which he earned a yellow card in the 81st minute. Tanko also scored a penalty during the penalty shootout but couldn't prevent the club from losing 5–3 during penalties.

References

1996 births
Living people
Nigerian footballers
Association football midfielders
Club Tijuana footballers
Dorados de Sinaloa footballers
Pioneros de Cancún footballers
Ventura County Fusion players
Los Angeles Force players
Ascenso MX players
USL League Two players
National Independent Soccer Association players
Nigerian expatriate footballers
Expatriate footballers in Mexico
Expatriate soccer players in the United States
People from Abuja